Edmund Smith may refer to:
Edmund Smith (Australian politician) (1847–1914), member of the Victorian Legislative Council
Edmund Smith (poet) (1672–1710), English poet
Edmund Smith (soccer) (1902–1978), Scottish-US soccer forward
Edmund Smith (MP) for Helston
Edmund A. Smith (1870–1909), American inventor
Edmund Horace Smith (1855–1931), Australian politician, member of the WA Legislative Assembly
Edmund Kirby Smith (1824–1893), United States Army officer and educator
Edmund Munroe Smith (1854–1926), American jurist and historian

See also
Edmund Wyldbore-Smith (1877–1938), British civil servant, diplomat, and businessman
Edmund Hakewill-Smith (1896–1986), South African-born British General
Ed Smith (disambiguation)
Edmund Smyth (1858–1950), Anglican bishop